A Prince Among Men is a British sitcom that ran on BBC1 from 15 September 1997 to 14 June 1998, broadcasting 12 episodes over two series. It starred Chris Barrie as Gary Prince, a former international football star turned entrepreneur. The theme music was by Jamie Marshall. The sitcom was not well received.

Episodes

Series 1 (1997)

Series 2 (1998)

References

External links
 
 

1990s British sitcoms
1997 British television series debuts
1998 British television series endings
BBC television sitcoms
English-language television shows
Television shows set in England